The 2019 Ice Speedway of Nations was the 41st edition of the FIM's Ice Speedway World Championship for national teams and the first in its re-branding as the Ice Speedway of Nations. The event was held at the Anatoly Stepanov Stadium in Togliatti, Russia.

Russia won their 17th consecutive world title and also won the title for the 37th time (including Soviet Union) during the 41 years that the championships have been held.

Final Classification

See also 
 Ice racing
 Ice Speedway of Nations
 Individual Ice Speedway World Championship

References 

Ice speedway competitions
World